Perla is a genus of common stoneflies in the family Perlidae. There are at least 30 described species in Perla.

Species
These 30 species belong to the genus Perla:

 Perla abdominalis Guerin-Meneville, 1838 c g
 Perla aegyptiaca Pictet, F.J., 1841 c g
 Perla bipunctata Pictet, F.J., 1833 c g
 Perla burmeisteriana Claassen, 1936 c g
 Perla carantana Sivec & Graf, 2002 c g
 Perla carletoni Banks, 1920 c g
 Perla caucasica Guerin-Meneville, 1838 c g
 Perla caudata Klapálek, 1921 c g
 Perla comstocki Wu, C.F., 1937 c g
 Perla coulonii Pictet, F.J., 1841 c g
 Perla cymbele Needham, 1909 c g
 Perla duvaucelii Pictet, F.J., 1841 c g
 Perla grandis Rambur, 1842 c g
 Perla horvati Sivec & Stark, 2002 c g
 Perla illiesi Braasch & Joost, 1973 c g
 Perla ione Needham, 1909 c g
 Perla kiritschenkoi Zhiltzova, 1961 c g
 Perla lineatocollis Blanchard, 1851 g
 Perla madritensis Rambur, 1842 c g
 Perla marginata Panzer, 1799 i c g
 Perla maxima (Scopoli, 1763) i
 Perla melanophthalma Navás, 1926 c g
 Perla mexicana Guerin-Meneville, 1838 c g
 Perla minor Curtis, 1827 c g
 Perla nirvana Banks, 1920 c g
 Perla orientalis Claassen, 1936 c g
 Perla pallida Guerin-Meneville, 1838 c g
 Perla shestoperowi Navás, 1933 c g
 Perla xenocia Banks, 1914 c g
 Perla zwicki Sivec & Stark, 2002 c g

Data sources: i = ITIS, c = Catalogue of Life, g = GBIF, b = Bugguide.net

References

Further reading

External links

 

Perlidae